The 1999 World Juniors Track Cycling Championships were the 25th annual Junior World Championships for track cycling held in Athens, Greece in August 1999.

The Championships had six events for men (1 kilometre time trial, Points race, Individual pursuit, Team pursuit, Sprint and Team sprint) and four for women (500 metre time trial, Points race, Individual pursuit and Sprint).

Events

Medal table

References

UCI Juniors Track World Championships
1999 in track cycling
1999 in Greek sport